HMS Aubrietia (K96) was a Flower-class corvette built for the Royal Navy (RN) from 1941-1946. She was active as a convoy escort in the Atlantic and Mediterranean.

Design and construction
The Flower-class arose as a result of the Royal Navy's realisation in the late 1930s that it had a shortage of escort vessels, particularly coastal escorts for use on the East coast of Britain, as the likelihood of war with Germany increased. To meet this urgent requirement, a design developed based on the whale-catcher Southern Pride - this design was much more capable than Naval trawlers, but cheaper and quicker to build than the Hunt-class destroyers or  sloops that were alternatives for the coastal escort role.

Displacement was about  standard and  full load.

Design armament was a single BL 4-inch Mk IX naval gun forward and a single 2-pounder "pom-pom" anti-aircraft cannon aft, although the pom-poms were not available until 1941, so early Flowers such as Aubrietia were completed with improvised close-range anti aircraft armament such as Lewis guns or Vickers .50 machine guns instead.

Aubrietia formed part of the initial 26-ship order for Flower-class corvettes placed on 25 July 1939 under the 1939/40 Naval estimates. She was laid down at George Brown & Company's, Greenock shipyard on 27 October 1939, was launched on 5 September 1940 and completed on 23 December 1940.

Service history
In November 1941 she was adopted by the civil community of Horsforth, Yorkshire  which raised £241,000 following a warship week National Savings Campaign. This was over twice the target figure of £120,000.

From 1941 to 1944, Aubrietia saw service on convoy escort duty in the Battle of the Atlantic, the Mediterranean and North Africa.

Royal Navy 
Between 12 January 1941 and 13 April 1945, Aubrietia escorted 85 convoys.

In 1941, Aubrietia was part of the Atlantic convoy 3rd Escort Group operating out of the port of Greenock.

On 9 May 1941, Aubrietia was on escort duty as part of Convoy OB-318. On the same day, she spotted the periscope of the U-110 and depth charged it, forcing the submarine to surface.

After February 1942, she moved to support convoys on the Atlantic run between Freetown, Sierra Leone and Liverpool. On 30 March 1942, Aubrietia picked up some of the survivors from the British merchant ship Muncaster Castle, which was torpedoed and sunk south-south-west of Monrovia, Liberia.

In November 1942, she was deployed as an escort for assault convoys in the Mediterranean as support of planned allied landings in North Africa (Operation Torch).

From March  1943, Aubrietia  convoys was redeployed for defence of convoys during Atlantic passage between Liverpool and Freetown until May 1944. In June 1943, she was transferred to the 41st Escort Group in this role.

In May 1944, Aubrietia was deployed at Gibraltar for patrol and convoy defence of convoys operating between the  Mediterranean and  Liverpool.

In June 1944, Aubrietia  joined the TG 80.6 Antisubmarine and Convoy Control Group during planned landings in South France and came under US Navy command. In November 1944, she returned to Royal Navy control and continued as an escort for Atlantic convoys between Freetown, the Mediterranean and Liverpool, until April 1945.

Fate 
Following VE day, Aubrietia was placed on the Disposal List and was  sold in 1948 to Kosmos, a Norwegian company, for use as a mercantile buoy tender. Aubrietia was renamed Arnfinn Bergan. Arnfinn Bergan was converted to a whale catcher in 1951, and remained in service until laid up in Sandjeford, Norway and was scrapped in Grimstad, Norway in December 1966.

References

External links 
Service histories of Royal Navy warships in World War 2
HMS Aubretia at uboat.net
Service histories of Royal Navy Warships in World War II, HMS Aubretia (K96)
Convoy OB318 at ConvoyWeb
London Gazette Announcements of the DSO medals and other mentions of Aubrietia crew members

Flower-class corvettes of the Royal Navy
1940 ships
Enigma machine
Ships built on the River Clyde